The 1970 Cleveland Indians season was the 70th season for the franchise. The club finished in fifth place in the American League East with a record of 76 wins and 86 losses.

Offseason
 December 5, 1969: Horacio Piña, Ron Law and Dave Nelson were traded by the Indians to the Washington Senators for Dennis Higgins and Barry Moore.
 December 10, 1969: Luis Tiant and Stan Williams were traded by the Indians to the Minnesota Twins for Dean Chance, Bob Miller, Ted Uhlaender, and Graig Nettles.
 January 17, 1970: Chris Chambliss was drafted by the Indians in the 1st round (1st pick) of the 1970 Major League Baseball Draft.

Regular season

Season standings

Record vs. opponents

Notable transactions
 June 4, 1970: 1970 Major League Baseball Draft
Tommy Smith was drafted by the Indians in the 5th round.
Dennis Kinney was drafted by the Indians in the 10th round.
 August 11, 1970: Lou Klimchock was released by the Indians.

Opening Day Lineup

Roster

Player stats

Batting
Note: G = Games played; AB = At bats; R = Runs scored; H = Hits; 2B = Doubles; 3B = Triples; HR = Home runs; RBI = Runs batted in; AVG = Batting Average; SB = Stolen bases

Pitching
Note: W = Wins; L = Losses; ERA = Earned run average; G = Games pitched; GS = Games started; SV = Saves; IP = Innings pitched; R = Runs allowed; ER = Earned runs allowed; BB = Walks allowed; K = Strikeouts

Award winners
 Ray Fosse, Gold Glove Award
All-Star Game

Farm system

Notes

References
1970 Cleveland Indians team page at Baseball Reference
1970 Cleveland Indians team page at www.baseball-almanac.com

Cleveland Guardians seasons
Cleveland Indians season
Cincinnati Indians